The Tropical Bowl was a college football bowl game played at Gator Bowl Stadium in Jacksonville, Florida. The game was played between 1951 and 1953 between historically black colleges and universities (HBCUs). The first game in 1951 was organized by Jacksonville businessmen after the 1951 Florida A&M Rattlers football team neglected to play a game in Jacksonville.

Game results

See also
 Tropical Bowl (all-star game), an unrelated postseason all-star game of the same name

References

Defunct college football bowls
Recurring sporting events established in 1951
Recurring sporting events disestablished in 1953
1951 establishments in Florida
1953 disestablishments in Florida
American football in Jacksonville, Florida
Sports competitions in Jacksonville, Florida